Ernest William Hornung (professionally known as E. W. Hornung; 1866–1921), was an English poet and writer. From a Hungarian background, Hornung was educated at Uppingham School; as a result of poor health he left the school in December 1883 to travel to Sydney, where he stayed for two years. He returned in early 1886 when his father was dying and bankrupt, and began writing professionally shortly afterwards.

Hornung had his first work published in 1887—the short story "Stroke of Five" in Belgravia magazine. His first novel, A Bride from the Bush, was published in 1890, and Hornung used his Australian experiences as a backdrop to the story. He went on to use Australia as a setting or plot element in a further seven novels and two collections of short stories.

In 1899 The Amateur Cracksman was published, a series of short stories that introduced A. J. Raffles, a gentleman thief in late-Victorian Britain. Hornung dedicated the book to his friend, the writer Arthur Conan Doyle: "To A.C.D. This form of flattery", and the narrative form is similar to Doyle's Sherlock Holmes stories, with Raffles and his partner Bunny Manders being the criminal counterparts to Holmes and Dr. Watson. Two further short story collections and a novel followed, as did a play, Raffles, The Amateur Cracksman, first shown at the Princess Theatre, New York in 1903. It is for the character of Raffles that Hornung is best remembered.

In 1893 Hornung married Constance Doyle (1868–1924), the sister of Arthur Conan Doyle and in 1895 their son, Arthur Oscar, was born. Oscar was killed at the Second Battle of Ypres in July 1915. It marked the end of Hornung's work in fiction, and after that point he published three works of poetry—two of which were first published in The Times—and two volumes of non-fiction: a biography of his son and an account of his time working at the front line as ambulance driver, rest-station attendant and for the YMCA. Hornung's fragile constitution was further weakened by the stress of his war work. To aid his recuperation, he and his wife visited the South of France in 1921. He fell ill from influenza on the journey, and died on 22 March 1922, aged 54.

Publications in periodicals
This list may be incomplete. Four Raffles stories ("Le Premier Pas", "Wilful Murder", "The Knees of the Gods", and "The Last Word") were not published in periodicals and only appeared in short story collections.

Novels and story collections

Plays

Non-fiction

Poetry

Notes and references
Notes

References

Sources

External links

 
 Works by E. W. Hornung at Project Gutenberg
 Works by E. W. Hornung at Internet Archive
 at Internet Archive

Bibliographies by writer
Bibliographies of British writers
Works by E. W. Hornung